The 2019 Six Nations Cup (for sponsorship reasons) also known as 2019 M1 Nations Cup was the thirteenth edition of the Singaporean Nations Cup was held in OCBC Arena from 20–26 October 2019. The tournament featured six nations including hosts Singapore, defending champions Cook Islands along with Botswana, Ireland, Papua New Guinea and Namibia.

The opening match between Singapore and Namibia ended on a thrilling draw at 54–54. Namibia defeated hosts Singapore in the final 49–42 to win their first M1 Nations Cup title.

Squads

Points Table

Pool stage

5th place playoff

3rd place playoff

Final

See also 

 Netball in Singapore

References 

2019
2019 in netball
Netball
2019 in Singaporean sport
October 2019 sports events in Asia
2019 in Irish women's sport
2019 in Namibian sport
2019 in Botswana sport
2019 in Cook Islands sport
2019 in Papua New Guinean sport